Murray Clifford Oliver (November 14, 1937 – November 23, 2014) was a Canadian professional ice hockey centre, coach, and scout.  Murray also played Minor League Baseball for the Batavia Indians, then an affiliate of the Cleveland Indians.

Playing career
Oliver grew up in Hamilton and played junior hockey with the Hamilton Tiger Cubs of the Ontario Hockey Association. After scoring 90 points in 52 games as a 20-year-old, he signed a professional contract and was assigned to the Edmonton Flyers, an affiliate of the Detroit Red Wings of the National Hockey League (NHL). As an NHL rookie during the 1959-60 season, he scored 20 goals. His first NHL goal occurred on November 21, 1959 in a 3-3 tie versus Boston.  However, Detroit was loaded at the centre position, which made Oliver expendable. He was traded to the Boston Bruins partway through the next season.

Oliver played for the Bruins until 1967. While in Boston, Oliver centred the B.O.W. line with wingers Johnny Bucyk and Tommy Williams, where he starred as a crafty stickhandler and patient playmaker. He put up a NHL career-high 68 points in 1964, despite knee surgery the prior season. He was traded in 1967 to the Toronto Maple Leafs, where he centred a line for three years with Bob Pulford and Ron Ellis.

Oliver was traded on May 22, 1970 (announced May 26) to the Minnesota North Stars in exchange for Terry O'Malley, the rights to Brian Conacher and cash. Previously, the Maple Leafs had attempted to trade Oliver to the St. Louis Blues for goaltender Jacques Plante, but an excess of centres for St. Louis prevented the deal. Similarly, the Chicago Black Hawks were involved in a possible trade, but Chicago's price of Oliver and Bob Pulford in exchange for Jim Pappin was too high for the Maple Leafs, prompting the trade to Minnesota. Oliver played five seasons with the North Stars. He scored a NHL career-high 27 goals in 1971-72. In 1975, after a bitter contract dispute with Stars management, he retired.

In 18 seasons, Oliver played 1127 regular season games and scored 274 goals with 454 assists for a total of 728 points. He played in the NHL All-Star Game five times. After retiring he was hired by former teammate Lou Nanne as Minnesota's assistant coach. He worked with the club until the 1985–86 NHL season, with 37 games as head coach. He became a scout with the Vancouver Canucks and later took over as the club's director of pro scouting. On November 23, 2014 he died of a heart attack at the age of 77.

Career statistics

Regular season and playoffs

NHL coaching record

Minor League Baseball
On June 25, 1958 Murray was assigned to play for the Batavia Indians, where scouts hailed him as "one of the greatest athletes we've ever seen".  In his debut, which was delayed because of a broken arm he suffered during the hockey season, he went hitless in three at-bats and committed one error. Over only 8 more games, mostly at third base, he batted .185 and committed an error per game, and was released by the Indians.

See also
List of NHL players with 1,000 games played

References

External links
 

1937 births
2014 deaths
Boston Bruins players
Canadian ice hockey centres
Detroit Red Wings players
Edmonton Flyers (WHL) players
Hamilton Tiger Cubs players
Ice hockey people from Ontario
Sportspeople from Hamilton, Ontario
Minnesota North Stars coaches
Minnesota North Stars players
Toronto Maple Leafs players
Vancouver Canucks scouts
Canadian ice hockey coaches